This is a list of the world's lowest civilian airports, situated less than  above mean sea level. The facility must be public, include at least one hard paved runway, and support general or commercial aviation .

See also
 List of highest airports

Notes

References

Lowest
Lowest airports